KXF or kxf may refer to:

 KXF, the IATA code for Koro Airport, Koro Island, Fiji
 kxf, the ISO 639-3 code for Manumanaw language, Burma and Thailand